Stephen Louis Brusatte (born April 24, 1984) is an American paleontologist and evolutionary biologist, who specializes in the anatomy and evolution of dinosaurs. He was educated at the University of Chicago for his BS degree, at the University of Bristol for his MSc on a Marshall Scholarship, and finally at the Columbia University for MPhil and PhD. He is currently a Reader in Vertebrate Palaeontology at the University of Edinburgh.

In addition to his scientific papers and technical monographs, his popular book Dinosaurs (2008) and the textbook Dinosaur Paleobiology (2012) earned him accolades, and he became the resident palaeontologist and scientific consultant for the BBC Earth and 20th Century Fox's 2013 film Walking With Dinosaurs, which is followed by his popular book Walking with Dinosaurs Encyclopedia. His book The Rise and Fall of the Dinosaurs: A New History of a Lost World (2018), written for the adult lay person, won widespread acclaim, and was a New York Times bestseller.
In June 2022 he published The Rise and Reign of the Mammals: A New History, from the Shadow of the Dinosaurs to Us.

Biography

Brusatte was born in Ottawa, Illinois to Jim and Roxanne Brusatte. He was educated at the Ottawa Township High School. From 2002, he attended the University of Chicago from where he earned his BS in geophysical sciences in 2006. He studied under Paul Sereno. He was elected a Student Marshal, the highest academic honor the university bestows to undergraduates. He was also the winner of the John Crerar Foundation Science Writing Prize and the Howard Hughes Institute Undergraduate Research Fellowship. In 2006, he was awarded the Marshall Scholarship to study in the United Kingdom. He entered the University of Bristol and obtained an MSc in both palaeobiology and earth sciences in 2008. His master's thesis was about the origin of a group of dinosaurs and was titled Basal Archosaur Phylogeny and Evolution, on which he was supervised by Michael J. Benton. He returned to the US to join the Columbia University, from where he completed his MPhil in 2011 and PhD in 2013 from the Department of Earth and Environmental Sciences. During this period he concurrently worked as a researcher at the Division of Paleontology, American Museum of Natural History. He became a Chancellor's Fellow in Vertebrate Palaentology at the School of GeoSciences in the University of Edinburgh in February 2013.
He is a member of the Editorial Board for Current Biology.

Contributions

He is the author of the 2002 book Stately Fossils: A Comprehensive Look at the State Fossils and Other Official Fossils and the 2008 book Dinosaurs. Brusatte has additionally authored several scientific papers as well as over 100 popular articles for magazines such as Fossil News, Dino Press, Dinosaur World, and Prehistoric Times. At Chicago, he aided in the creation of two databases, TaxonSearch and CharacterSearch, that organize taxonomic and phylogenetic information.

Discovery of fossils

Brusatte has discovered more than a dozen new species of vertebrate fossils. His breakthrough in the study of dinosaur fossils was while at the University of Chicago with Paul Sereno. Having discovered the skull, jaw and neck fossils of a 95-million-year-old theropod in the Elrhaz Formation of Niger in 1997, Sereno was looking for a competent student to analyse it. Brusatte took the opportunity in 2004, completed the project in 2005, and published his findings in 2007 with Sereno. The animal was found to be a new species of Carcharodontosaurus, which they named C. iguidensis. He estimated that the complete skull would be more than five feet long, one of the biggest skulls of a known carnivorous dinosaur. This was followed by the description of another new theropod from the Elrhaz Formation in January 2008, Kryptops palaios. Another significant discovery was from China in 2014. Alongside Chinese paleontologist Lü Junchang and others, Brusatte described a 66-million-year-old dinosaur, Qianzhousaurus sinensis, which was closely related to the famous T. rex. Due to its long snout, it was given the nickname "Pinocchio rex".

In January 2015 his team announced the discovery of a marine reptile belonging to the Jurassic Period, around 170 million years ago. The giant, long-nosed, fish-like animal, named Dearcmhara shawcrossi, was found on the Isle of Skye in Scotland. He warrants that the species is not ancestral to Nessie, the Scottish legendary marine animal, as popular media liked to hype, but is certainly the first "distinctly Scottish prehistoric marine reptile".

Documentary Appearances
Stephen Brusatte took part in several documentaries. In 2015 T. Rex Autopsy, a documentary produced by National Geographic Channel and aired on 7 June 2015. In 2016 he appeared in T-Rex: An Evolutionary Journey, produced by NHK.

Movies
In February 2020 Brusatte was hired as a member of the consulting team of paleontologists to work on Jurassic World Dominion. The film included many feathered dinosaurs for the first time in a Jurassic Park movie. Brusatte reported that he had been extensively involved with the production team and that he made director Colin Trevorrow promise to include feathered dinosaurs in this installment of the franchise.

Works
Stately Fossils: A Comprehensive Look at the State Fossils and Other Official Fossils (2002)
Dinosaurs (2008)
Field Guide to Dinosaurs (2009)
Dinosaur Paleobiology (2012)
Were Stegosaurs Carnivores? (2012)
Walking with Dinosaurs Encyclopedia (Walking With Dinosaurs the 3d Movie) (2013)
Day of the Dinosaurs: Step into a spectacular prehistoric world (Science X 10) (2016)
Pinocchio Rex and Other Tyrannosaurs (2017)
The Rise and Fall of the Dinosaurs: A New History of a Lost World (2018)
The Rise and Reign of the Mammals: A New History, from the Shadow of the Dinosaurs to Us (2022)

References

External links
Web page
Profile at The Conversation

1984 births
Living people
American paleontologists
Marshall Scholars
University of Chicago alumni
People from Ottawa, Illinois
Columbia University alumni
Alumni of the University of Bristol
Academics of the University of Edinburgh